The third series of The Voice เสียงจริงตัวจริง ( also known as The Voice Thailand ) on 7 September 2014. The show was hosted by Songsit Rungnopphakhunsi and Rinrani Siphen on Channel 3.

Teams
Colour key
  Winner
  Runners-up
  Third place
  Fourth place
  Eliminated in the Live shows
  Eliminated in the Knockouts
  Artist was stolen by another coach in the Battle rounds 
  Eliminated in the Battles

The Blind Auditions

Episode 1: Blind Auditions,  Week 1 
The first blind audition episode was broadcast on 7 September 2014.

Group performance: The voice Thailand's Coach - We Will Rock You / We Are The Champions

Episode 2: Blind Auditions,  Week 2 
The second blind audition episode was broadcast on 14 September 2014.

Episode 3: Blind Auditions,  Week 3 
The third blind audition episode was broadcast on 21 September 2014

Episode 4: Blind Auditions,  Week 4 
The fourth blind audition episode was broadcast on 28 September 2014

Episode 5: Blind Auditions,  Week 5 
The fifth blind audition episode was broadcast on 5 October 2014

Episode 6: Blind Auditions,  Week 6 
The last blind audition episode was broadcast on 12 October 2014

Battle Rounds
This year's battle rounds featured a new "steal" twist. After each battle round the losing artist then pitched to the other three coaches on why they should join their team. It was then up to the coaches (who have a limited amount of time) to press their red button to steal the artist. They could press their button as many times as they liked but were only allowed to steal two artists. If more than one coach wanted to steal the same artist then it was up to the artist to decide which team to join.

The battle round advisors were Kong working with Saowani Nawaphan, Kim with Wichian Tantiwimonphan, Joey boy with Narongwit Techathanawat and Stamp with Suthi Saengserichon.

Episode 7-10: Battle Rounds
  – Coach hit his/her "I WANT YOU" button
  – Artist defaulted to this coaches team
  – Artist elected to join this coaches team
  – Battle winner
  – Battle loser
  - Battle loser but was saved by another coach

Knock outs
 – Knockout winner
 – Eliminated artist

Episode 11-12: Knockouts

Live Performance

Episode 13: Live Playoff, Week 1
Broadcast on 
  – Advanced artist 
  – Eliminated artist

Episode 14: Live Playoff, Week 2
Onair 7 December 2014
 Key
  – Advanced
  – Eliminated

Episode 15: Final Live Performance
Broadcast on 14 December 2014

 Key
 Winner
 Runner-up
 Third Place
 Fourth Place

Result of Live Performance
Artist member 

Color

External links
The official website

The Voice Thailand
2014 Thai television seasons